The Honda U3-X is an experimental self-balancing one-wheeled personal transporter shown in 2009.

History

It was unveiled by Honda's CEO on September 24, 2009, and it was announced that it would be shown at the 2009 Tokyo Motor Show. Time magazine called it one of the 50 best inventions of 2009.
In April 2010, Honda engineers did a short demonstration of two of the devices in Times Square, New York City.
In May 2010, Honda representatives demonstrated the U3-X at the Honda Collection Hall in Motegi, Tochigi, Japan

Honda presented the Honda UNI-CUB, a successor to this device at Osaka Motor Show 2013.

Design and operation
Honda developed the U3-X with technology originally developed for ASIMO the bipedal human robot project. Honda states that the "U" stands for unicycle and for universal.
Honda U3-X is a compact experimental device that fits comfortably between the rider's legs, to provide free movement in all directions just as in human walking - forward, backward, side-to-side, and diagonally. It uses Honda Omni-Traction (HOT) drive system to permit it to move in any lateral direction. The system uses multiple small diameter motorised wheels connected inline to form one large diameter wheel. Rotating the large diameter wheel moves the U3-X forward and backward, while rotating the small diameter wheels moves it side-to-side. Combining these movements causes the U3-X to move diagonally.

It has not been announced yet whether the vehicle will be offered for public sale. The price is not announced yet.

Specifications
Honda stated the U3-X key specifications as follows:

 Length 
 Width (stowed) 
 Height (stowed) 
 Weight < 
 Top speed 
 Drive system:  Omni Traction Drive System
 Battery type: Lithium-ion battery
 Operation time:  ≈ 1 hour

See also
Toyota Winglet
Segway PT

References

Further reading

External links

Honda U3-X Personal Mobility Device in NY, indoor and outdoor demonstrations, April 2010.

U3-X
Electric concept cars
Robotics at Honda
One-wheeled balancing robots
Personal transporters